The Korea Oriental Instant Medicinal Centre is a state-owned North Korean pharmaceutical company founded in 1968. It is best known for selling Neo-Viagra-Y.R., an alleged traditional Korean (Koryo) medical supplement, whose active ingredient is 50 mg of Sildenafil (Viagra), combined with Korean herbal medicines.

Products
Neo-Viagra-Y.R.
Tongbanghangamso(동방항암소):medicine for purported cancer treatment made from korean traditional medicine ingredients such as ginseng and Eleutherococcus (known in korean as Ogapi).
Hyolgwansechokso(혈관세척소):medicine purported to have  blood vessel cleaning effects using ingredients such as herb extracts.

See also
Pugang Pharmaceutic Company, another state-run pharmaceutical company in North Korea

References

Medical and health organizations based in North Korea
Traditional Korean medicine
Drugs
Companies of North Korea